Edmund Bacon may refer to:

Sir Edmund Bacon, 2nd Baronet, of Redgrave (c. 1570–1649), English MP for Eye and for Norfolk in 1593 and 1625
Sir Edmund Bacon, 2nd Baronet, of Gillingham (c. 1660–1683), see Bacon baronets
Sir Edmund Bacon, 4th Baronet, of Mildenhall (1672–1721), British MP for Orford
Sir Edmund Bacon, 4th Baronet, of Redgrave (d. 1685), father in law of Sir Edmund Bacon, 5th Baronet
Sir Edmund Bacon, 5th Baronet (1693–1738), British MP for Thetford, 1722–1738
Sir Edmund Bacon, 6th Baronet, of Mildenhall (1725–1750), see Bacon baronets
Sir Edmund Bacon, 6th Baronet, of Redgrave (c. 1680–1755), British MP for Thetford, 1710–1713, and for Norfolk, 1713–1715 and 1728–1741
Edmund Bacon (1785–1866), business manager and overseer for Thomas Jefferson, 3rd President of the United States
Sir Edmund Bacon, 13th Baronet (1903–1982), Lord Lieutenant of Norfolk
Edmund Bacon (architect) (1910–2005), American urban planner, architect, educator and author

See also
Ed Bacon (disambiguation)